The Boston mayoral election of 1892 saw the reelection of Nathan Matthews Jr. to a third consecutive term.

Results

See also
List of mayors of Boston, Massachusetts

References

Mayoral elections in Boston
Boston
Boston mayoral
19th century in Boston